Clunie is a small Scottish settlement. 

Clunie may also refer to:

 Clunie (surname)
 Loch of Clunie, Scotland
 Clunie Water, a river of Aberdeenshire, Scotland
 Mount Clunie, Mount Clunie National Park, New South Wales, Australia

See also
 Cluny (disambiguation)